The 1992 Allan Cup was the Canadian senior ice hockey championship for the 1991–92 senior "AAA" season.  The event was hosted by the Saint John Vito's in Saint John, New Brunswick.  The 1992 tournament marked the 84th time that the Allan Cup has been awarded.

Teams
Charlottetown Islanders (East)
Saint John Vito's (Host)
Stony Plain Eagles (Pacific)
Warroad Lakers (West)

Results
Round Robin
Warroad Lakers 5 - Charlottetown Islanders 4
Saint John Vito's 2 - Stony Plain Eagles 1
Charlottetown Islanders 5 - Stony Plain Eagles 1
Saint John Vito's 7 - Warroad Lakers 2
Stony Plain Eagles 10 - Warroad Lakers 9 (OT)
Saint John Vito's 5 - Charlottetown Islanders 3
Semi-final
Stony Plain Eagles 5 - Charlottetown Islanders 1
Final
Saint John Vito's 6 - Stony Plain Eagles 2

Winning Roster

Scott MacKenzie - Defense 
Eric Bissonnette - Defense 
Phill Huckins - Defense 
Paul Hanson - Forward 
Mike Clark - Defense 
Mike Dwyer - Forward 
Ron Gaudet - Forward 
Wayne Moore - Forward 
Ron Hatfield - Forward 
Randy Thomas - Forward 
Mark Farwell - Defense 
Martin LeFebvre - Forward 
Charlie Bourgeois - Defense 
Patrick Cloutier - Defense 
Dan O'Brien - Forward 
Bob Kaine - Forward 
Blair MacPherson - Defense 
Tony Wormell - Forward 
Todd Stark - Forward 
Mike Boyce - Defense 
Bob Brown - Forward 
Sylvain Mayer - Forward 
Rick Poirier - Goalie 
Dan Leblond - Forward 
Dave Matte - Goalie 
Michel Boucher - Forward
Coaches - Blair Nicholson, Brian Ford, Dave Wright. 
General Manager - Neil MacKenzie 
Owners - Nick and Peter Georgoudis 
Trainers - Bob Maloney and Fred Gorman

References

External links
Allan Cup archives 
Allan Cup website

Allan Cup
Ice hockey in Saint John, New Brunswick
Allan
Ice hockey competitions in New Brunswick
1992 in New Brunswick